Pamphilus may refer to:

 Pamphilus of Amphipolis, painter of 4th century BC, head of Sicyonian School
 Pamphilus of Alexandria, grammarian in the 1st century
 Saint Pamphilus of Caesarea (late 3rd century - 309), scholarly creator of the library at Caesarea
 Pamphilus the Theologian, sixth-century writer
 Saint Pamphilus of Sulmona (died c. 700), bishop of Sulmona
 Pamphylos, legendary founder of Pamphylia
 Pamphilus of Sicily, poet of the 4th century BC mentioned by Athenaeus in the Deipnosophistae
Pamphylus (mythology)

See also
Panfilo (name)
Pamphilus de amore, a 12th-century Latin comedy
Small heath (butterfly), scientific name Coenonympha pamphilus